Estradiol phosphate, or estradiol 17β-phosphate, also known as estra-1,3,5(10)-triene-3,17β-diol 17β-(dihydrogen phosphate), is an estrogen which was never marketed. It is an estrogen ester, specifically an ester of estradiol with phosphoric acid, and acts as a prodrug of estradiol in the body. It is rapidly cleaved by phosphatase enzymes into estradiol upon administration. Estradiol phosphate is contained within the chemical structures of two other estradiol esters, polyestradiol phosphate (a polymer of estradiol phosphate) and estramustine phosphate (estradiol 3-normustine 17β-phosphate), both of which have been marketed for the treatment of prostate cancer.

See also
 List of estrogen esters § Estradiol esters

References

Abandoned drugs
Estradiol esters
Phosphate esters
Prodrugs
Synthetic estrogens
Steroids